Imperial is a 2009 study of California's Imperial Valley and Imperial County by American author William T. Vollmann. The product of over a decade's research, the 1,344-page published text is Vollmann's longest single-volume work. The book is divided into thirteen sections and explores the history, economics and geography of the region from 13,000 B.C. to the present day, with a particular focus on the border with Mexico.

Vollmann has called Imperial "my Moby-Dick". The book was a finalist for the 2009 National Book Critics Circle Award for general nonfiction.

References

2009 non-fiction books
American history books
21st-century history books
Books about California
Historiography of California
Works by William T. Vollmann
Imperial County, California